Mehranrud-e Jonubi Rural District is in the Central District of Bostanabad County, East Azerbaijan province, Iran. At the census of 2006, its population was 4,661 in 1,030 households; there were 6,172 inhabitants in 1,620 households at the following census of 2011; and in the most recent census of 2016, the population of the rural district was 6,084 in 1,754 households. The largest of its 13 villages was Kargan-e Qadim, with 2,742 people.

References 

Bostanabad County

Rural Districts of East Azerbaijan Province

Populated places in East Azerbaijan Province

Populated places in Bostanabad County